Perényi may refer to:
Béla Perényi, Hungarian chess player
Eleanor Perenyi, American gardener and garden writer
Péter Perényi, Comes of Temesvár
Péter Perényi (1502–1548), Voivode of Transylvania
Miklós Perényi, (born 5 January 1948), Hungarian cellist
Zsigmond Perényi (disambiguation)